The 1934 Women's World Games were the fourth edition of the international games for women. The tournament was held between 9–11 August at the White City Stadium in London, United Kingdom. These were the last athletic games exclusively for women, a planned fifth tournament for 1938 in Vienna was cancelled as women were allowed to compete in all regular athletics events at the Olympic Games and other international events. The first major tournament were the 1938 European Athletics Championships even though the tournament was split up into two separate events. The 3rd European Athletics Championships in 1946 were the first combined championships for both men and women.

Events
The games were organized by the Fédération Sportive Féminine Internationale under Alice Milliat as a response to the IOC decision to include only a few women's events (100 metres, 800 metres, 4 × 100 m relay, high jump and discus) in the 1928 Olympic Games.

The games were attended by 200 participants from 19 nations (including now dissolved nations): Austria, Belgium, Canada, Czechoslovakia, France, Germany, Great Britain, Holland, Hungary, Italy, Japan, Latvia, Palestine, Poland, Rhodesia, South Africa, Sweden, United States, and Yugoslavia.

The athletes competed in 12 events: running (60 metres, 100 metres, 200 metres, 800 metres, 4 x 100 metres relay and hurdling 80 metres), high jump, long jump, discus throw, javelin, shot put and pentathlon (100 metres, high jump, long jump, javelin and shot put). The tournament also held exhibition events in basketball, handball and football.

The tournament was opened with an olympic style ceremony. The Canadian flag bearer was Lillian Palmer as captain of the Canadian team. The games attended an audience of 15,000 spectators and several world records were set.

The games were the first to include a women's pentathlon.

A special commemorative medal was issued for the participants and the games were closed with a formal banquet.

Medal summary

Points table

References

External links
 Participation medal
 Film (British Pathé) 1934 Women's World Games
 Picture Grieme Selma at the high jump event
 Menue from the closing banquet

Women's World Games
International athletics competitions hosted by England
Athletics in London
Women's World Games
Women's World Games
Multi-sport events in the United Kingdom
International sports competitions in London
Women's World Games
Women's World Games
Women's World Games
Women's World Games